Opheusden is a railway station located in Opheusden, Netherlands. The station opened on 1 November 1882 and is on the Elst–Dordrecht railway. Train services are operated by Arriva. The station temporarily closed between 1890 and 1898. Between 1882 and 1890, this station was called Dalwagen(straat).

Train services

Bus services

References

External links
NS website 
Dutch Public Transport journey planner 

Railway stations in Gelderland
Railway stations opened in 1882
Neder-Betuwe